The 1979 US Open was a tennis tournament played on outdoor hard courts at the USTA National Tennis Center in New York City in New York in the United States. It was the 99th edition of the US Open and the third Grand Slam tennis event of the year. The tournament was held from August 28 to September 9, 1979. John McEnroe and Tracy Austin won the singles titles.

Seniors

Men's singles

 John McEnroe defeated  Vitas Gerulaitis 7–5, 6–3, 6–3 
It was McEnroe's 1st career Grand Slam title.

Women's singles

 Tracy Austin defeated  Chris Evert 6–4, 6–3 
It was Austin's 1st career Grand Slam title. Austin also became the youngest-ever US Open champion, aged 16 years and 9 months.

Men's doubles

 John McEnroe /  Peter Fleming  defeated  Bob Lutz /  Stan Smith 6–2, 6–4

Women's doubles

 Betty Stöve /  Wendy Turnbull defeated  Billie Jean King  Martina Navratilova 7–5, 6–3

Mixed doubles

 Greer Stevens /  Bob Hewitt defeated  Betty Stöve /  Frew McMillan 6–3, 7–5

Juniors

Boys' singles
 Scott Davis defeated  Jan Gunnarson 6–3, 6–1

Girls' singles
 Alycia Moulton defeated  Mary Lou Piatek 7–6, 7–6

References

External links
Official US Open website

 
 

 
US Open
US Open (tennis) by year
US Open
US Open
US open
US Open